This is a list of types of land vehicles by their number of wheels. The number of wheels a land vehicle has can vary widely, from just zero wheels or one wheel to many. The number of wheels a vehicle has can have a significant impact on its stability, maneuverability, and performance. This list aims to provide an overview of the various types of land vehicles categorized by their number of wheels.

0

Bumper car
Horse
Ice skates
Litter (vehicle)
Ski
Sled
Snowboard
Space hopper
Tank
Tracked vehicle
Travois

1
Unicycle
Electric unicycle
Monowheel
Wheelbarrow
Wooden ox/Chinese wheelbarrow

2

Cart
Pulled rickshaw
Hansom cab
Sulky
Tilbury (carriage)
Dicycle
Segway
Self-balancing scooter
Bicycle
Motorized bicycle 
Electric bicycle
Recumbent bicycle
Safety bicycle
Cargo bike
Gyrocar/Bi-Autogo
Hand truck
 Shopping trolley (caddy)

2-3
Motorcycle (Usually 2 wheels but sometimes 3)
Cabin motorcycle
Handcycle
Rollator

3

Bath chair
 Land sailing
Motorcycle with sidecar (typically 3 wheels overall)
Pallet jack
Tricycle
Motorized tricycle
Steam tricycle
Whike
Three-wheeler
Tilting three-wheeler
Forecar
Trikke
Twike
Ultralight trike

4

All-terrain vehicle (four-wheeler)
Automobile
Baby transport
Quadricycle / Microcar
Quadracycle 
Go kart
Golf cart (motorised)
Flatbed trolley
Forklift
Four-wheeler
Mobility scooter
Model car
Pallet jack
 Recreational vehicle
Riding mower
Roller skates
Serving cart
Soapbox racer
Skateboard
Snakeboard
Longboard
Toy wagon
Trolley suitcase e.g. Trunki
Velomobile
Wagon
 Shopping cart
Wheelchair

More than 4
 Pentacycle
 Six-wheel drive vehicle (6x6)
 Eight-wheel drive vehicle (8x8) 
 Twelve-wheel drive vehicle (12x12)
 18 wheeler
 8 Wheeler
 Truck

See also
Wheels
Wheel and axle
Rim
Tires
Single-track vehicle
Hovercraft
Tracked vehicles
Vehicle category
Wheeled vehicles

References